Grégory Martinetti (born 5 November 1972) is a Swiss wrestler. He competed in the men's freestyle 85 kg at the 2000 Summer Olympics.

References

External links
 

1972 births
Living people
Swiss male sport wrestlers
Olympic wrestlers of Switzerland
Wrestlers at the 2000 Summer Olympics
Place of birth missing (living people)